Ira Trombley (April 16, 1952 – December 20, 2009) was a Vermont legislator and politician. Trombley served in the Vermont House of Representatives from 2002 until his death.

Notes

Members of the Vermont House of Representatives
1952 births
2009 deaths
20th-century American politicians